No Stranger to Danger is the second album by Payolas, released in 1982.  It contains the hit "Eyes of a Stranger".

The album is only available on vinyl and cassette; it has not been released on CD or as a commercial digital download, although some tracks (notably "Romance" and "Eyes of a Stranger") appear on some compilations. The album reached #5 in Canada, and was #37 in the 1982 Year End chart. "Eyes of a Stranger" reached number 4 in Canadian charts, and was number 34 in the year-end chart.

Track listing
All songs written by Bob Rock and Paul Hyde, except as noted.

 "Romance" – 3:23
 "Eyes of a Stranger" – 4:54
 "Some Old Song" – 3:37
 "Rose" (written by Paul Hyde) – 3:59
 "Hastings Street" – 4:59
 "Youth" – 4:17
 "Lights to Change" – 2:27
 "Mystery to Me" – 3:04
 "Pennies into Gold" – 3:06
 "Screaming" – 4:09
 "Rockers" – 2:46

Personnel
 Paul Hyde: vocals, guitars
 Bob Rock: electric/acoustic and synthetic guitars, vocals
 Christopher Taylor: drums, etc.
 Mick Ronson: producer, keyboards, guitar, vocals
 Laurence Wilkins: Bass

Notes
 "Eyes of a Stranger" was covered by P.O.D. on their The Warriors EP, Volume 2 album.

References

External links
 

1982 albums
Payolas albums
Albums produced by Mick Ronson
A&M Records albums